Akron–Westfield Community School District is a rural public school district headquartered in Akron, Iowa. It operates Akron–Westfield Elementary School and Akron–Westfield High School and Middle School in Akron.

The district, entirely in Plymouth County, serves Akron, Westfield, and the surrounding rural areas.

History
The district formed on July 1, 1981, as a merger of the Akron and Westfield school districts.

Prior to December 2018, the district had proposed failed bond attempts two times. In 2018 the district proposed a $7 million bond, with the election scheduled for December 11 that year.

Schools
The district operates three schools, all in a single facility in Akron:
 Akron–Westfield Elementary
 Akron–Westfield Middle School
 Akron–Westfield Senior High School

See also
List of school districts in Iowa

References

Further reading
 2018 Budget Summary

External links
 Akron-Westfield Community School District
  

School districts in Iowa
Education in Plymouth County, Iowa
1981 establishments in Iowa
School districts established in 1981